The superficial branch of medial circumflex femoral artery appears between the quadratus femoris and upper border of the adductor magnus, and anastomoses with the inferior gluteal artery, lateral femoral circumflex artery, and first of the perforating arteries of the deep femoral artery (crucial anastomosis).

References 

Arteries of the lower limb